The Civil Aviation Authority of the Slovak Republic (CAA, LÚ SR) is a government agency of Slovakia. Its head office is located on the property of M. R. Štefánik Airport in Bratislava.

It was established by Law 143/1998 Act of April 2, 1998 on Civil Aviation (Aviation Act) and on Amendment of Some Acts.

See also
 Aviation and Maritime Investigation Authority

References

External links
Civil Aviation Authority
Civil Aviation Authority 

Civil aviation in Slovakia
Government of Slovakia
Slovakia
1998 establishments in Slovakia
Organizations established in 1998
Aviation organisations based in Slovakia